California Wives are an American band from Chicago, formed in 2009. The band released its debut full-length CD, Art History, on Vagrant Records in October 2012.

Members
Current
Jayson Kramer - vocals, bass, guitar, keyboards
Hans Michel - guitar
Graham Masell - guitar
Joe O'Connor - drums

Former
Dan Zima - bass

Discography

Albums

References

Indie pop groups from Illinois
Indie rock musical groups from Illinois
Musical groups from Chicago
Musical groups established in 2009
Vagrant Records artists